Scoria  is a type of vesicular volcanic rock.

Scoria may also refer to:

 Scoria (wrestler), Mexican wrestler, also known as Escoria
 Elvis Scoria (born 1971), Croatian football player
 Slag, or other waste from iron production
 Scoria, a synonym of the moth genus Siona (moth)